The Egtved Girl  (c. 1390–1370 BC) was a Nordic Bronze Age girl whose well-preserved remains were discovered outside Egtved, Denmark in 1921. Her burial has been dated by dendrochronology to 1370 BC. Only the girl's hair, brain, teeth, nails and a little of her skin remain preserved.

Burial
The barrow was excavated in 1921, and a coffin was found in an east-west alignment. It was sealed and transported to the National Museum of Denmark in Copenhagen, where it was opened, revealing the Egtved Girl.

In the coffin, the girl was wrapped in an ox hide. She wore a loose bodice with sleeves reaching the elbow. She had a bare waist and wore a short string skirt. She had bronze bracelets, and a woollen belt with a large disc decorated with spirals and a spike. At her feet were the cremated remains of a child aged 5 to 6. By her head there was a small birch bark box that contained an awl, bronze pins, and a hair net.

Before the coffin was closed she was covered with a blanket and an ox hide. Flowering yarrow (indicating a summer burial) and a bucket of beer made of wheat, honey, bog-myrtle and cowberries were placed atop. Her distinctive outfit, which caused a sensation when it was unearthed in the 1920s, is the best preserved example of a style now known to be common in northern Europe during the Bronze Age. The good preservation of the Egtved Girl is due to the acidic bog conditions of the soil, which is a common condition of this locale.

Reconstruction 
The outfit was reconstructed for the National Museum of Denmark by the Lejre Experimental Centre and is on display there. A reconstructed set of clothes, as well as details of the excavation, are on display in the Egtved Girl's museum at the excavation site.

Origin and life 
Initial work by Frei et al in 2015, since contradicted, examined chemical isotopes of strontium from the Egtved Girl's teeth, fingernails, hair and clothing, and based on these, proposed that she had likely come from the Black Forest region of Germany, but married and moved to Denmark, subsequently traveling back and forth between the two areas.

However, Thomsen and Andreasen demonstrated in 2019 that the strontium isotopic data obtained from the area surrounding the grave and used by Frei et al for comparison against the remains had been contaminated by additional strontium contained in the agricultural lime used in modern farming in the Egtved area. When Thomsen and Andreasen analyzed samples locally from places uncontaminated by modern farming, they found that the range of strontium isotopic values in the surrounding natural environment matched those in the girl. Thus, it is most plausible that she originated from and spent her entire life in the Egtved area, and did not come far abroad, as proposed by Frei et al. Thomsen and Andreasen's results show that the girl did live about half the year in one area – likely the river valley in Egtved – and the other half of the year in another place – likely the local plateau, perhaps in the practice of transhumance farming and seasonal pastoral movement within a small area.

In a 2019 article based on strontium isotope analysis, Sophie Bergerbrant suggests an origin of Sweden or Norway for the Egtved Girl.

Gallery

See also
Håga mound
Haraldskær Woman
List of unsolved deaths
Skrydstrup Woman
The King's Grave

Citations

References
Barber, E. W. The Mummies of Ürümchi. Macmillan, London, 1999. .
Hogan, C. Michael, "Girl Barrow", The Megalithic Portal, editor A. Burnham, 4 October 2007
Michaelsen, K. K. Politikens bog om Danmarks Oldtid. Politiken, Denmark, 2002. .

External links

The Egtved Girl on National Museum of Denmark website.

1390s BC births
1370s BC deaths
1921 archaeological discoveries
14th-century BC women
Archaeological discoveries in Denmark
Archaeological discoveries in Europe
Archaeology of death
Prehistoric objects in the National Museum of Denmark
Deaths in Denmark
Germanic archaeological artifacts
Mummies
Nordic Bronze Age
Unsolved deaths